Katherine D. 'Kathy' Landing is an American politician of the Republican Party. She is the member of the South Carolina House of Representatives representing District 80. House District 80 was held by Jermaine Johnson, but after redistricting the District covered a new geographic area, leading Johnson to run for and ultimately win SC House District 70. 

In the 2020 general election for US House of Representatives, Landing competed in a large field of Republican primary candidates, but was defeated in the Primary by Nancy Mace. In 2022, Landing ran for the new SC State House District 80, and after winning the Republican Primary, went on to defeat Democratic Nominee Donna Brown Newton for South Carolina House of Representatives District 80. Landing formerly served on Mount Pleasant County Council and was a candidate for Mayor in 2021.

Statements were issued by Henry McMaster, Governor of South Carolina, who won his re-election bid, and Drew McKissick, chair of the South Carolina Republican Party.

Landing serves on the House Education and Public Works Committee and on the House Rules Committee.

In 2023, Landing was briefly among the Republican co-sponsors of the South Carolina Prenatal Equal Protection Act of 2023, which would make women who had abortions eligible for the death penalty; she later withdrew her sponsorship.

References 

Republican Party members of the South Carolina House of Representatives
Year of birth missing (living people)
Living people

Women state legislators in South Carolina